In Unix and Unix-like operating systems,  is a utility used to send messages to another user by writing a message directly to another user's TTY.

History
The write command was included in the First Edition of the Research Unix operating system.  A similar command appeared in Compatible Time-Sharing System.

Sample usage
The syntax for the write command is:
$ write user [tty]
message

The write session is terminated by sending EOF, which can be done by pressing Ctrl+D. The tty argument is only necessary when a user is logged into more than one terminal.

A conversation initiated between two users on the same machine:
$ write root pts/7
test

Will show up to the user on that console as:
Message from root@wiki on pts/8 at 11:19 ...
test

See also

 List of Unix commands
 talk (Unix)
 wall (Unix)

References

Unix user management and support-related utilities
Standard Unix programs
Unix SUS2008 utilities